Santee is a 1973 American Color Western film directed by Gary Nelson and starring Glenn Ford. It was one of the first motion pictures to be shot electronically on videotape, using Norelco PCP-70 portable plumbicon NTSC cameras and portable Ampex VR-1200 2" VTRs, before being transferred to film at Consolidated Film Industries in Hollywood. It was the only film to be produced by Edward Platt (of Get Smart fame).

Plot
Jody Deakes joins up with his father after many years, just to discover that his dad is part of an outlaw gang on the run from a relentless bounty hunter named Santee. Jody is orphaned soon after Santee catches up to the gang, and follows Santee in hopes of taking vengeance for his father's death. Instead, however, Jody discovers that Santee is a good and loving man, tormented by the death of his young son at the hands of another outlaw gang. Santee and his wife take Jody in and a father and son relationship begins to grow. Then the gang that shot Santee's son shows up.

Cast
 Glenn Ford as Santee 
 Michael Burns as Jody 
 Dana Wynter as Valerie
 Jay Silverheels as John Crow [final film performance]
 Harry Townes as Sheriff Carter
 John Larch as Banner
 Robert Wilke as Deaks
 Robert Donner as J.C.
 Taylor Lacher as Lance 
 John Bailey as Homesteader
 X Brands as Hook
 Caruth C. Byrd as Piano Player 
 Chuck Courtney as Grayson
 Lindsay Crosby as Horn
 William Ford as Postmaster
 John Hart as Cobbles 
 Russ McCubbin as Rafe
 Robert Mellard as Jonesy 
 Brad Merhage as Santee's Son
 Boyd Morgan as Stagecoach Driver
 Ben Zeller as Freddie

See also
 List of American films of 1973

References
John Willis Screen World 1974 Escrito por John Willis

External links
 

1970s English-language films
1973 Western (genre) films
1973 films
American Western (genre) films
Crown International Pictures films
Films directed by Gary Nelson
1970s American films